Rhythm And Joy 1980 Reunion Concert. Recorded on the last day of 1980 
at the Uptown Theater in Kansas City, Missouri. This was the first time in five years the Ozark Mountain Daredevils all played together. These recently discovered tapes and video feature the original lineup.

Track listing
"Standing On The Rock" 
"Black Sky" 
"Walkin' Down The Road" 
"One More Night"
"Oh Darlin"
"Look Away"
"Country Girl"
"Cobblestone Mountain"
"Thin Ice"
"Arroyo"
"Noah(Rode The Storm)"
"Jackie Blue"
"Durty Gurl"
"Satisfied Mind"
"Lovin' You"
"Tuff Luck"
"If You Want To Get To Heaven"

DVD
"Chicken Train"
"Look Away"
"Country Girl"
"Oh Darlin"
"Cobblestone Mountain"
"Thin Ice"
"Noah(Rode The Storm"
"Jackie Blue"
"Duty Gurl"
"Satisfied Mind"
"Lovin' You"
"Tuff Luck"
"If You Wanna Get To Heaven"
BONUS PERFORMANCE
"Commercial Success"

Personnel
The original lineup
Steve Cash - harp, vocals
Randle Chowning - guitar, vocals
John Dillon - guitar, vocals
Larry Lee - drums, piano, vocals
Mike "Supe" Granda - bass, vocals
Buddy Brayfield - keyboards

plus
Steve Canaday - guitars, drums, vocals
Terry Wilson - guitar, vocals
Bill Jones - sax, flute

Background vocals by
The Darelicks: Beth Spindler, Connie Canaday-Ripley, Jody Troutman (also flute on "Cobblestone Mountain")

Production
Producer: Paul Peterson
Collection Produced: Cary E. Mansfield and Paul Peterson
Digitally Remastered: Dan Hersch, DigiPrep, Hollywood
Nnotes: Rush Evans
Art Direction & Design: Bill Pitzonka
Video Stills: Gary Peterson

The Ozark Mountain Daredevils albums
Albums produced by Glyn Johns
A&M Records live albums